Ophiomorus nuchalis, the Nilson's snake skink or plateau snake skink, is a species of skink, a lizard in the family Scincidae. The species is endemic to Iran.

References

Ophiomorus
Reptiles of Iran
Endemic fauna of Iran
Reptiles described in 1978
Taxa named by Claes Andrén
Taxa named by Göran Nilson